Carex livida is a species of sedge known by the common names livid sedge and pale sedge.

Distribution
It has a scattered, interrupted circumboreal distribution, occurring throughout much of Eurasia and northern North America. It also occurs in Panama and South America. It is extirpated in California.

Description
This sedge forms small clumps of stems up to 50 to 55 centimeters tall. The stiff, leathery leaves are a pale, waxy blue-gray and have channels on their surfaces. The inflorescence contains separate pistillate and staminate spikes. The plant spreads mostly by sprouting from its rhizome, but it also produces seed.

This plant grows in wet substrates with groundwater at the surface. The soils are often calcareous and rich in nitrogen. It can typically be found in fens and bogs with sphagnum mosses and other sedges.

References

External links
The Nature Conservancy
USDA Plants Profile

Further reading
Gage, E. and D. J. Cooper. Carex livida: A Technical Conservation Assessment. USDA Forest Service, Rocky Mountain Region. June 21, 2006.

livida
Flora of Europe
Flora of North America
Plants described in 1805